Kent McClard is a record label owner and zine publisher from Goleta, California.

Early life
McClard grew up in a "broken home" and says he was a troublesome child. As a teenager, he discovered hardcore punk; its freedom and specific ethics have influenced him deeply and helped to "define" his life. After that he began several DIY enterprises, including what is said to be the first show and the first fanzine of his town.

Ebullition Records
In early 1990, the former Maximumrocknroll columnist started Ebullition Records with contributions from Sonia Skindrud (writer of the zine Exedra) and Brent Stephens (member of  Downcast). Skindrud came up with the name and Stephens drew the logo, but the label is primarily run by McClard.

Los Angeles hardcore band Inside Out was meant to record an LP as the first Ebullition release. However, Revelation Records asked them to release a 7" instead; the band chose the more established label. The record was not released for another year which was after the band had broken up. Inside Out had plans to release a second record called "Rage Against the Machine", which was a phrase McClard coined and used in some of his writings including in issue #9 of the zine No Answers.

HeartattaCk

HeartattaCk was a punk zine, along the lines of Punk Planet and Maximumrocknroll with a strong bent towards hardcore punk and anti-consumerism. It was published by Kent McClard and Lisa Oglesby from March 1994 through June 2006. In the final years of its publication it remained one of the most popular zines available. O'Connor describes it as being "one of half a dozen major punk fanzines in the USA during the 1990s."

References

External links
 Official site for Ebullition Records and HeartattaCk
 

Living people
1967 births
American music journalists
American magazine publishers (people)
American music managers
Punk people
People from Goleta, California
Journalists from California